Ihi, Ehee (Nepal Bhasa:ईही) is a ceremony in the Newar community in Nepal in which pre-adolescent girls are "married" to the Suvarna Kumar which is a symbol of the god Vishnu, ensuring that the girl becomes and remains fertile. It is believed that if the girl's husband dies later in her life, she is not considered a widow because she is married to Vishnu, and so already has a husband that is believed to be still alive. This was basically done to dodge the tradition of 'Sati Pratha', where after the husband dies, the widow sacrifices herself in the burning fire.

Ihi is falsely labeled as "Bel Bibaha". However, this naming is incorrect as "Bel Bibaha" would mean marriage to a fruit Bel(or Bael). At the core of the Ihi is a traditional Hindu ceremony of marriage, but the spouse is Visnu/Narayana. 

This ritual has been in practice for hundreds of years. It is a highly sacred ritual and a real kanyaadaan as a virgin girl is handed over to God. Actually, during the Ihi ceremony girl is married to a golden statue of lord Vishnu known as Suvarna Kumar, and Bel fruit is given as its witness. As bel fruit (wood apple) has a peculiar quality of not getting rotten and remaining fresh forever, it is sometimes considered as Divya Purusha (divine male) or incarnation of the god. This ceremony lasts for two days. All the rituals of a Hindu marriage are performed in this ceremony. So, these rituals need not be performed again while getting married to a man. That's why in Newars it is not necessary for a Groom to go in wedding procession [janti (nep.),  Baraat (Hindi)]. The family members and friends bring the bride to the groom's house where few rituals are performed. But nowadays newar grooms take part in their wedding procession hence the wedding in this community has become a bit lengthy as compared before.

A second marriage, known as the Bahra ceremony or Sun marriage, occurs before a girl's first menstruation, which starts with a seclusion in a dark room for twelve days.

See also
 Kanyadan
 Iihipaa
 Marriage in Hinduism

References

Further reading
 

Nepalese culture
Newar
Marriage in Hinduism